Streptococcus ratti is a species of Streptococcus. Streptococcus ratti can be viewed as a type of oral bacteria. It is a type of bacteria that may be found in healthy individuals. One example may be oral cavities. Streptococcus ratti is also a component of dental biofilms.

References

External links
 Type strain of Streptococcus ratti at BacDive -  the Bacterial Diversity Metadatabase

Streptococcaceae
Gram-positive bacteria
Bacteria described in 1977